Peceli Rinakama is a former politician in Fiji.  He served as a member of the Parliament of Fiji from 1999 to 2001.

2000 coup and aftermath

Rinakama was elected to Parliament in the 1999 election, representing the constituency of Naitasiri for the Fijian Association Party.  During the 2000 Fijian coup d'état, he joined the Cabinet of George Speight.  As a result, he was refused entry to New Zealand in 2003 due to his involvement in the coup.  Following the coup, he switched his allegiance to the Conservative Alliance, but failed to win re-election in the 2001 election.

In 2003, he alleged that the Soqosoqo ni Vakavulewa ni Taukei (SVT) party was behind the 2000 coup, and that it had plotted to overthrow the government of Mahendra Chaudhry even before it took office. Shortly afterwards he was charged with taking an unlawful oath for purporting to join Speight's Cabinet, and in 2004 he was convicted and sentenced to three years imprisonment.  He was granted early release for good behaviour in December 2005, having served half his sentence.

In 2005 it was alleged that Rinakama had benefitted from a US$13 million fraud in the agriculture ministry in 2001.

Assassination plot

In November 2007, Rinakama was one of ten people arrested and charged with conspiring to assassinate Fijian dictator Frank Bainimarama. All charges against him were withdrawn in December of that year.

Disappearance

On 5 March 2010 Rinakama was abducted by soldiers from a house in Suva.  He has not been seen since, and there are fears he has been disappeared.

On 11 March 2010, the Fijian government admitted that Rinakama was in custody, though they would not say where or what for. On 12 March, they claimed he had been released. Despite this, he has not been seen by family or friends, and there are significant fears for his safety.

References

Living people
I-Taukei Fijian members of the House of Representatives (Fiji)
Soqosoqo ni Vakavulewa ni Taukei politicians
Prisoners and detainees of Fiji
Fijian Association Party politicians
Conservative Alliance-Matanitu Vanua politicians
Politicians from Naitasiri Province
Year of birth missing (living people)